WANN-CD, virtual channel 32 (UHF digital channel 20), is a low-powered, Class A television station licensed to Atlanta, Georgia, United States.

The station was recently sold for $5.25 million to Sovryn Holdings Inc, a division of Madison Technologies.

Digital television

Digital channels
The station's digital channel is multiplexed:

References

External links
WANN official site

Television channels and stations established in 1986
ANN-CD
Low-power television stations in the United States
This TV affiliates
Comet (TV network) affiliates
Retro TV affiliates
Estrella TV affiliates
Charge! (TV network) affiliates
LATV affiliates